The Lloyd's building (sometimes known as the Inside-Out Building) is the home of the insurance institution Lloyd's of London. It is located on the former site of East India House in Lime Street, in London's main financial district, the City of London. The building is a leading example of radical Bowellism architecture in which the services for the building, such as ducts and elevators, are located on the exterior to maximise space in the interior.

In 2011, twenty-five years after its completion in 1986 the building received Grade I listing; at this time it was the youngest structure ever to obtain this status. It is said by Historic England to be "universally recognised as one of the key buildings of the modern epoch".
However, its innovation of having key service pipes, etc. routed outside the walls has led to very expensive maintenance costs due to their exposure to the elements.

History

The first Lloyd's building (address 12 Leadenhall Street) had been built on this site in 1928 to the design of Sir Edwin Cooper. In 1958, due to expansion of the market, a new building was constructed across the road at 51 Lime Street (now the site of the Willis Building). Lloyd's now occupied the Heysham Building and the Cooper Building.

By the 1970s Lloyd's had again outgrown these two buildings and proposed to extend the Cooper Building. In 1978, the corporation ran an architectural competition which attracted designs from practices such as Foster Associates, Arup and Ioeh Ming Pei. Lloyd's commissioned Richard Rogers to redevelop the site, and the original 1928 building on the western corner of Lime and Leadenhall Streets was demolished to make way for the present one, which was officially opened by Queen Elizabeth II on 18 November 1986. The 1928 building's entrance at 12 Leadenhall Street was preserved and forms a rather incongruous attachment to the 1986 structure. Demolition of the 1958 building commenced in 2004 to make way for the 26-storey Willis Building.

Design

The current Lloyd's building (address 1 Lime Street) was designed by the architect company Richard Rogers & Partners and built between 1978 and 1986. Bovis was the management contractor. Like the Pompidou Centre in Paris (designed by Renzo Piano and Rogers), the building was innovative in having its services such as staircases, lifts, ductwork, electrical power conduits and water pipes on the outside, leaving an uncluttered space inside. The 12 glass lifts were the first of their kind in the United Kingdom. Like the Pompidou Centre, the building was highly influenced by the work of Archigram in the 1950s and 1960s.

The building consists of three main towers and three service towers around a central, rectangular space. Its core is the large Underwriting Room on the ground floor, which houses the Lutine Bell within the Rostrum. Also on the first floor is the loss book which for 300 years has had entries of significant losses entered by quill. The first four galleries open onto the atrium space, and are connected by escalators through the middle of the structure. The higher floors are glassed in and can only be reached via the exterior lifts.

The 11th floor houses the Committee Room (also known as the Adam Room), an 18th-century dining room designed for the 2nd Earl of Shelburne by Robert Adam in 1763; it was transferred piece by piece from the previous (1958) Lloyd's building across the road at 51 Lime Street.

Modular in plan, each floor can be altered by addition or removal of partitions and walls.
In 2008 the Twentieth Century Society called for the building to be Grade I listed and in 2011 it was granted this status.

The building was previously owned by Dublin based real estate firm Shelbourne Development Group, who purchased it in 2004 from a German investment bank. In July 2013 it was sold to the Chinese company Ping An Insurance in a £260 million deal.

Criticism

The much-vaunted design innovation of having the service pipes, ducts, and stairwells outside the walls in fact led to such costs caused by weathering and maintenance that Lloyds considered vacating the building in 2014. 
Lloyd's former chief executive Richard Ward stated: "There is a fundamental problem with this building. Everything is exposed to the elements, and that makes it very costly."

In popular culture

Use in feature films and record album covers
It is seen on the cover of British pop group Five Star's 1986 album Silk and Steel; Hundred Reasons' debut album Ideas Above Our Station; and the 2001 reissue of British electronic musician Mike Paradinas's 1993 album Tango n' Vectif, under the alias μ-ziq.

Use as a location in films

 Guardians of the Galaxy (2014)
 The Anomaly (2014)
 Climbing Great Buildings (2010)
 The Ghost Writer (2010)
Mamma Mia! (2008)
 A Good Year (2006)
 Code 46 (2003)
 Spy Game (2001)
 Proof of Life (2000)
 Fred Dibnah's Magnificent Monuments (2000), TV series
 Entrapment (1999)
 The Avengers (1998)
 Different for Girls (1996)
 Hackers (1995)
 Search Out Science "Search Out Space" (1990)

Gallery

See also

EPM Intelligent Building - a Medellin building inspired by the Lloyd's building
Willis Building, opposite at 51 Lime Street, on the site of a former Lloyd's building
30 St Mary Axe – Norman Foster's gherkin-shaped skyscraper nearby
122 Leadenhall Street – a skyscraper opposite on the northern side of Leadenhall Street
52–54 Lime Street – 'The Scalpel' skyscraper opposite
List of tallest buildings and structures in London
World Architecture Survey

References

External links

Galinsky: Lloyd's building
Lloyd's official website
0lll Architecture Gallery: Lloyd's building (images)

Office buildings completed in 1986
Office buildings in London
Skyscrapers in the City of London
Richard Rogers buildings
Grade I listed buildings in the City of London
Grade I listed office buildings
Skyscraper office buildings in London
1986 establishments in England